So You've Ruined Your Life is the debut studio album by American band Get Set Go, released on September 30, 2003 through TSR Records. The album displays the band's early pop-punk sound, and is the only album to feature founding members Patrick Flores and Amy Woods in its entirety. The hidden track, "Wait", has been used in the TV series Grey's Anatomy and has been used in the first volume of the series soundtrack.

Background and recording
The band formed in 2002, originally under the name Vermicious K, then later on as All Your Bass Are Belong To Us, then finally as Get Set Go. After recording a 3-track demo with Ben Vaughn, the group gained the attention of the independent family-operated label TSR Records and were signed. The group then proceeded to work on their debut full-length in the spring of 2003, again hiring Vaughn to help with production. The group first recorded the drum and bass tracks at Stanley Recordings before going to Mad Dog Studios to record the vocals and guitars. The entire album was mixed at MT Studios, Burbank and finally mastered at Bernie Grundman Studios. The entire album took around 3 months to complete.

The artwork for the album was done by artist Dave Johnson, who later did the cover art for the band's 2011 album Fury of Your Lonely Heart.

Critical reception
While not reviewed by many since its release, the attention the album did receive was positive. Brad Filicky of CMJ Magazine gave the album a positive review, stating "So You've Ruined Your Life proves that this is a group ready for its close-up and is bound to get the respect that it deserves".

Commercial performance
Despite the fact that the band did a national tour to promote the album, So You've Ruined Your Life failed to reach any sort of commercial success. By 2004, both Flores and Woods left the group to pursue other careers. Guitarist and vocalist Michael Torres would later fall into a state of depression and drug addiction, which eventually resulted in him getting sober and continuing Get Set Go with a revolving door of new members.

Track listing

Personnel
Adapted from the So You've Ruined Your Life liner notes.

Get Set Go
Michael "Mike TV" Torres – guitar, vocals
Patrick "Dr. Modo" Flores – bass, vocals
Amy Wood – drums

Additional musicians
Ryan "Schmedly" Mayen – backing vocals, keyboards, guitars, tambourine
John DeBaun – backing vocals
Sean Spillane – backing vocals
Benjamine Chadwick – backing vocals
Nate Greeley – backing vocals

Production and design
Ben Vaughn – production
John Would – recording
John DeBaun – recording
Matt Thorne – mixing
Bernie Grundman – mastering
Brian Ewing – layout, design
Peter Mars – layout, design
Dave Johnson – artwork

References

2003 debut albums
Get Set Go albums
Albums produced by Ben Vaughn